Rimma Koshelyova (born 1 April 1936) is a Soviet hurdler. She competed in the women's 80 metres hurdles at the 1960 Summer Olympics.

References

1936 births
Living people
Athletes (track and field) at the 1960 Summer Olympics
Soviet female hurdlers
Olympic athletes of the Soviet Union
Place of birth missing (living people)
Universiade silver medalists for the Soviet Union
Universiade medalists in athletics (track and field)
Medalists at the 1961 Summer Universiade